Kalpana Hasmukhrai Rawal (born 15 January 1946 in Bhuj, India) is a Kenyan-Asian lawyer and the former Deputy Chief Justice and Vice President of the Supreme Court of Kenya. She was sworn in on June 3, 2013 as the Deputy Chief Justice of Kenya in a ceremony presided over by the President of Kenya and the Chief Justice. After a protracted case on the question of the retirement age of Judges who were appointed under the old Constitution of Kenya, the Supreme Court delivered a Ruling which effectively set the retirement age at 70 years, sending the Deputy Chief Justice and one other Supreme Court Judge who had reached 70 on retirement.

Education and early career
Rawal holds a Bachelor of Arts degree, and Bachelors and Master of Laws in constitutional and administrative law. She received her LLB and LLM degrees in India, where she practised for three years under the tutelage of P. N. Bhagwati who later became the 17th Chief Justice of India.

In 1973, at the age of 27, Kalpana Hasmukhrai Rawal moved to Kenya from India to join her husband, businessman Hasmukhrai Rawal. Two years later, she set up her own law firm, becoming the first woman to run a law firm in Kenya - a move that put her in the long path to being appointed the first female judge of Asian origin by then President Daniel Moi. The remarkable woman from India would serve in the highest court in the land as the deputy Chief Justice of the Supreme Court. Her father U.J. Bhatt served as a judge in the Gujarat High Court and her grandfather Jaduram Bhatt who was a law minister.

Kalpana was born in 1946 in Bhuj (Kutch), India to Umangilal (U.J) and Anuben Bhatt of Gujrat. When she was born, India was a conservative society and giving birth to daughters was no cause for celebration. Her parents, however, gave her and her four sisters the best education
  
and she showed her worth by superseding their expectations and becoming the first female lawyer in Kenya. She was enrolled as an advocate of the High Court of Kenya in July, 1975. She had taught administration and regular police officers at Lower Kabete for a year. When she started her private practice, K H Rawal Advocates, the offices were located at Imenti House and she worked from there until 1999 when she was appointed Commissioner of Assize. In 1975 she worked as a teacher of both administration and regular police officers at Lower Kabete. In the same year, she set up a private practice becoming the first woman lawyer to do so in Kenya. She run a general practice until 1999 when she was appointed a commissioner of assize, and judge of the High Court thereafter.

Judicial career
Rawal has over 40 years experience in the legal profession and as at May 2011 had served as a judge for 11 years most of which was in Nairobi. A year later, the mother of two sons was appointed a Judge of the High Court of Kenya, and she consequently stopped working at her law firm which is still operational. During her tenure, she reformed each of the divisions in which she was appointed – Civil, Criminal, Family, Environmental and Land Law – by reducing severe backlog and improving the expeditious disposal of cases.

In April, 2010, Rawal was appointed the Liaison Judge for Kenya making her a member of the International Hague Network of Judges and the Chief Justice also appointed her to assist the International Criminal Court (ICC) to take evidence of security officers in respect of the investigation into 2007/2008 Post Election Violence.

In 2011, while still at the High Court, she delivered a judgment against the Ethics and Anti-Corruption Commission, barring it from confiscating assets of Stanley Amuti, former National Water Conservation and Pipeline Corporation finance boss, to recover Sh140 million.

In the same year, she was among nine applicants interviewed for the position of Chief Justice of Kenya by the Judicial Service Commission but she lost to former Chief Justice Willy Mutunga.

Opportunity came knocking on February 22, 2013 when the Judicial Service Commission nominated her for the position of Deputy Chief Justice.

During her 40 years as a legal professional, Rawal played a big role and paved the way for many women in the justice system
  
. Rawal’s pivotal role has not gone unnoticed
  
and she was awarded the Elder of the Order of Burning Spear (EBS) by President Uhuru Kenyatta.

Chief Justice interviews
In May 2011, she was among nine applicants interviewed for the position Chief Justice of Kenya by the Judicial Service Commission (Kenya). She however lost to the then eventual appointee Chief Justice Willy Mutunga.

2012 Kenya Police helicopter crash inquiry
Justice Rawal led the judicial inquiry into the June 2012 Kenya Police helicopter crash that killed all six people on board including Minister George Saitoti and Assistant Minister Orwa Ojode.

Vetting Board decision
In September 2012, the Kenya Judges and Magistrates Vetting Board in its fourth Determination declared Rawal fit for office. It had earlier delayed its decision as she was among judges hearing a national interest case to determine on the date of the next Kenyan general elections.

Deputy chief justice nomination
Following the resignation of Nancy Barasa, Rawal applied for the vacant position of Deputy Chief Justice advertised by the Judicial Service Commission (JSC) on 9 November 2012. The JSC however re-advertised because it was dissatisfied by the number of applicants. The position subsequently attracted applications from 17 women and one man. She was among five shortlisted for the position.

On 22 February 2013, the JSC announced that after completing the interviews it had nominated Court of Appeal Judge Kalpana Rawal. She was successfully vetted by Parliament, and then appointed by the President as the Deputy Chief Justice and Vice President of the Supreme Court.

Panama Papers
After the a huge leaked set of 11.5 million confidential documents that provide detailed information on more than 214,000 offshore companies listed by the Panamanian corporate service provider Mossack Fonsec. According to the documents date to September 7, 2007, her husband set up investment companies to invest in the U.K. These were perfectly legitimate and legal 
  
but she was not to have any control over the same. 
 
U.K. laws as well as international law allowed and indeed encouraged offshore holdings and provided tax incentives for such investments
  
. All her family's involvements were deemed perfectly legitimate
  
.

Retirement
Having been born in January 1946, Lady Justice Kalpana Rawal was required to retire from the Supreme Court upon reaching 70 in January 2016 in line with Article 167(1) of the Constitution of Kenya. However, when the Judicial Service Commission served her with a retirement notice, she launched a protracted case insisting that she should leave office at 74 years since she was first appointed as a Judge under the old Constitution of Kenya which set the retirement age of Judges at 74. Both the High Court and the Court of Appeal confirmed the retirement age as 70, but she filed a further appeal before her colleagues in the Supreme Court who delivered a ruling which effectively confirmed the retirement age as 70. She was therefore honourably retired on 14 June 2016. During her 40 years as a legal professional, Rawal played a big role 
  
and paved the way for many women in the justice system. Rawal’s pivotal role has not gone unnoticed
  
and she was awarded the Elder of the Order of Burning Spear (EBS) by President Uhuru Kenyatta.

Personal life
Her father was a judge of the High Court of India, while her grandfather served as a law minister in India.

See also
 First women lawyers around the world
 Supreme Court of Kenya

References

1946 births
Living people
20th-century Kenyan lawyers
21st-century Kenyan judges
Kenyan people of Indian descent
Kenyan women judges
People named in the Panama Papers
21st-century women judges